
The following is the Timeline of Armenian national movement which is the collection of activities during the Armenian national movement.

1860
 1862: Zeitun Uprising (Ottoman Empire)

1870
 May 1878: Treaty of San Stefano, Article 16 (Ottoman Empire)
 June 1878: Treaty of Berlin Article 61 (Ottoman Empire)
 June 1878: Catholicos Mgrdich Khrimian patriotic speech “The Paper Ladle” (Ottoman Empire)

1880
 1885: Armenakan Party founded (Russian Armenia)
 1887: Social Democrat Hunchakian Party founded
 1889: Bashkale clash (Ottoman Empire)

1890
 1890: Armenian Revolutionary Federation founded (Russian Armenia)
 1890 September 27: Gugunian Expedition
 1892: Mkrtich Khrimian becomes Catholicos of All Armenians
 1894: First Sasun Resistance
 1895 October: Zeitun Rebellion begins
 1896 June 3–11: Defense of Van
 1896 August 26: Ottoman Bank Takeover
 1897 July 25–27: Khanasor Expedition

1900
 1901 November: Battle of Holy Apostles Monastery
 1903 June 12: Armenian Church and its property (Russian Armenia)
 1904: Second Sasun Resistance
 1905 January 22: Revolution of 1905 starts in Russia (Russian Armenia)
 1905-1907: Armenian–Tatar massacres of 1905–1907 (Russian Armenia)
 1905 July 21: Yıldız assassination attempt 
 1907: Mkrtich Khrimian dies
 1908: Young Turk Revolution

1910
 1911: George V becomes Catholicos of All Armenians
 1912 January: The arrest of Armenian intellectuals (Russian Armenia)
 1912 November: George V creates the Armenian National Delegation, led by Boghos Nubar

1914 
 1914 January–February: Armenian reform package
 1914 November 1: Bergmann Offensive. Drastamat Kanayan and second battalion of the Armenian volunteers (Caucasus Campaign)
 1914: Battle of Sarikamish. Hamazasp (Srvandztian) and 3rd battalion. Keri (Arshak Gavafian) and 4th battalion. (Caucasus Campaign)

1915 
 1915 March: Zeitun Resistance (Armenian Resistance)
 1915 April–May: Siege of Van (Armenian Resistance)
 1915 May 27: Tehcir Law
 1915 June: Shabin-Karahisar uprising (Armenian Resistance)
 1915 June: Musa Dagh Resistance (Armenian Resistance)
 1915 July 26: Battle of Manzikert
 1915 September: Urfa Resistance (Armenian Resistance)

1916 
 1916 August: Battle of Bitlis. Andranik and his volunteers. (Caucasus Campaign)

1917 
 1917 February 23: Russian Revolution (Russian Armenia)
 1917 November 7: Bolshevik rule (Russian Armenia)
 1917 December 5: Armistice of Erzincan (Caucasus Campaign)

1918 
 1918 March 3: Treaty of Brest-Litovsk (Caucasus Campaign)
 1918 May 26: Battle of Sardarapat (Caucasus Campaign)
 1918 May 28: Official declaration of First Republic of Armenia (Caucasus Campaign)
 1918 June 4: Treaty of Batum (Caucasus Campaign)
 1918 October 30: Armistice of Mudros (Caucasus Campaign)

1919 
 1919 January 29: Aram Manukian dies
 1919 July 5: Turkish Courts-Martial of 1919–1920

1920 
 1920 August 10: Treaty of Sèvres
 1920 September 29-December 2: (Turkish and Soviet Invasion of Armenia)
 1920 November 25: Simon Vratsian becomes Prime Minister
 1920 November 29: Soviet army in Yerevan and fall of Armenian government
 1920 December 3: Treaty of Alexandropol

1921 
 1921 February: February Uprising starts
 1921 Mach 15: Talaat Pasha killed (Operation Nemesis)
 1921 March 16: Treaty of Moscow
 1921 July 13: Republic of Mountainous Armenia ensures Syunik remains part of Armenia
 1921 July 5: Karabakh given to Azerbaijan by Stalin's decision
 1921 October 13: Treaty of Kars

1922 
 1922 July 21: Djemal Pasha killed (Operation Nemesis)

See also
Armenian genocide

Politics of Armenia